Badrabad (also Romanized as Badrābād) is a village in Badr Rural District, in the Central District of Ravansar County, Kermanshah Province, Iran. At the 2006 census, its population was 401, in 86 families.

References 

Populated places in Ravansar County